The Peruvian Aprista Party (PAP) is a Peruvian political party and a member of the Socialist International. The party was founded as the American Popular Revolutionary Alliance (APRA) by Víctor Raúl Haya de la Torre, who originally intended to create a network of anti-imperialist social and political movements in Latin America. Members are called "companions", based on the fraternity espoused by Haya de la Torre. Originally a centre-left to left-wing party with democratic socialist and nationalist elements (in addition to the aforementioned anti-imperialism), the party moved closer to the political centre under the leadership of Alan García starting in the 1980s, embracing social democracy and later some Third Way policies. During García's second government (2006-2011), the party adopted a new face after implementing a series of policies labelled as centre-right, embracing free-market capitalism, dialogue with other right-wing parties and organisations in the country, and closer ties with religious organisations such as the Catholic Church and some Evangelical churches.

Founded continentally in 1924 in Mexico City, Mexico, and nationally in 1930 in Lima, it is one of the oldest political parties in Latin America. Among the Peruvian political parties in activity, specifically for having been stripped of electoral victories by coups or military governments after having triumphed democratically, it also went through two long periods of illegality, both under military and civilian governments, having been persecuted by the presidencies of Luis Miguel Sánchez Cerro and Manuel A. Odría. The Peruvian Aprista Party has gained in the presidency in two occasions: in 1985 and 2006, both under the candidacy of Alan García. In the extraordinary congressional elections of 2020, held after the dissolution of Congress in 2019, the APRA had its worst electoral result of 2.7%, failing to pass the 5% electoral threshold, which means that it would not have parliamentary representation for the first time in 25 uninterrupted years.

Although APRA does not operate throughout Latin America as its founder envisioned for, it has served as a powerful influence for other progressive Latin American political organizations, such as Democratic Action (AD) in Venezuela and the Socialist Party of Chile.

History

APRA was founded by Víctor Raúl Haya de la Torre in Mexico City on 7 May 1924 with aspirations to becoming a continent-wide party, and it subsequently influenced a number of other Latin American political movements, including Bolivia's Revolutionary Nationalist Movement (Movimiento Nacionalista Revolucionario, MNR), Dominican Republic's Dominican Revolutionary Party (Partido Revolucionario Dominicano, PRD) and Costa Rica's National Liberation Party (Partido Liberación Nacional, PLN).

It is the oldest surviving political party in Peru and one of the best established.  APRA is as much a social phenomenon as a political movement, with a membership whose loyalty to the party has been unwavering for several generations.

APRA initially espoused anti-imperialism, Pan-Americanism, international solidarity and economic nationalism. Years of repression and clandestinity, as well as Haya de la Torre's single-handed dominance of the party, resulted in striking sectarian and hierarchical traits. The party's structure and the party's hold over its rank and file proved more lasting than its original program.

Political activity since 1980
After several years of military rule, APRA was allowed to participate as a legal political party in 1979. The party gathered strong support from the electorate, managing to win a majority of seats in the newly created Constituent Assembly, and supervised the first democratic elections in 12 years.

Haya de la Torre was elected president of the Constituent Assembly and was slated to run as the party's presidential candidate in 1980. However, he died before the election. The party was divided between Armando Villanueva and Andres Townsend, each  of them claiming to be the political and ideological heir of Haya de la Torre. APRA chose Villanueva as its candidate, while Townsend and other members left the party to create the Hayist Bases Movement. The split among the Apristas allowed former president Fernando Belaúnde Terry of Acción Popular to win the election.

However, APRA managed to win in virtual control of both the Chamber of Deputies and the Senate. It was also during these election that Alan García started his political career, after being elected Deputy for the Province of Lima.

The youthful and charismatic García was elected president on 14 April 1985, with 45% of the vote during the first round. Since he did not receive the 50% of the vote required to win the presidency, García was required to enter the second round against Alfonso Barrantes Lingán (the leftist mayor of Lima) of the Izquierda Unida Coalition. Barrantes, however, decided not to enter the second round of the elections, saying he did not want to prolong the political uncertainty of the country.

García was thus declared president on 1 June and officially took power on 28 July 1985. It was the first time in its sixty-year history that the populist APRA party had come to power in Peru.

His presidency was marked by world-record hyperinflation with the annual rate exceeding 13,000 percent per year. García's administration devastated the local economy as well as all governmental institutions. Hunger, corruption, injustice, abuse of power, elitism, and social unrest raised to dramatic levels spreading throughout the whole nation, spurring terrorism.

At García's farewell speech, he was booed by the entire opposition forces and prevented from speaking. The anecdotal event was televised. That same day the board of the Chamber of Deputies requested the creation of a special committee to investigate García's presidency, accusing him of massive corruption and illicit enrichment. The committee attacked García with numerous proven accusations involving embezzlement, misappropriation and bribery, based -among other trustworthy sources- on a U.S. congressional investigation that linked García with the BCCI scandal and had found millions of dollars in banks. New York District Attorney Robert Morgenthau charged García officially. Later in 1992, then Senator John Kerry presided over the BCCI Scandal Report <The BCCI Affair>, which concluded that García was not only guilty of corruption, but also directly involved in an international racketeering network with activities that included drug and arms trafficking. Finally, the Peruvian Supreme Court, overturned prior judicial verdicts and declared all the probes and constitutional accusations against García "null".

In May 1989, APRA chose as its standard bearer Luis Alva Castro for the 1990 general election. For the final runoff, APRA sealed a hidden deal with Cambio 90 and Alberto Fujimori, to prevent the leading candidate Mario Vargas Llosa, today a Nobel laureate and renown novelist and political analyst, from getting elected. Fujimori, a complete unknown, was subsequently elected.

As Fujimori assumed the Presidency in 1990, Congress was dominated by the opposition forces of Mario Vargas Llosa's Democratic Front. Fujimori's party had gained only 32 deputies out of 180, and 14 senators out of 60. The majority was divided between APRA (22%) and the Democratic Front, with about 32% of Congress. In 1992, Fujimori organized a successful coup d'état. This allowed García to flee Peru and request asylum denouncing political persecution, the asylum was granted by Colombian president César Gaviria. Shortly after, under the protection of president Francois Mitterrand, García received again the privilege of political refuge and left Colombia to reside in Paris.

Fujimori convened elections for a Democratic Constituent Congress, in which APRA did not participate. In the 1995 general elections, the APRA nominee for president was Mercedes Cabanillas, gaining only 4%, behind former United Nations Secretary General Javier Pérez de Cuéllar (21%) and the reelected Fujimori (64%). The party only got 8 congressman out of 120, while Fujimori's Cambio 90-New Majority dominated Congress with 67.

In 2000, Abel Salinas was elected as the presidential nominee, being the worst general election for APRA, gaining only 1% of the popular vote. Only 6 APRA congressman were elected. As many assume the election was a fraud, Fujimori resigned after the corruption of his government was revealed by the opposition.

At the legislative elections, the party won 19.7% of the popular vote and 28 out of 120 seats in Congress. Its presidential candidate at the elections of the same day, Alan García Pérez, won 25.8% of the vote, placing second and was defeated in the second round by Alejandro Toledo.

In February 2005, García officially commenced his campaign for the 2006 presidential election. He came in second place by a slim margin over Lourdes Flores, and faced Ollanta Humala in a run-off election on 4 June. He became president again as Humala conceded after exit polls and partial vote counts showed García leading. Breaking News, World News and Video from Al Jazeera. He officially took office on 28 July 2006.

On the eve of leaving the government, García called a general election for 10 April 2011. APRA ran as a guest presidential candidate for former minister Mercedes Aráoz, but her candidacy was frustrated by numerous internal conflicts with other party leaders. In this way, the party participated in the elections without a candidate, obtaining 4 seats in Congress. It has remained an organized opposition party against the Ollanta Humala administration. For the 2016 elections, APRA signed an alliance with the Partido Popular Cristiano and Vamos Perú, under the title of "Alianza Popular (Popular Alliance)", with Alan García as the presidential candidate, who will serve a third term and long-time rival Lourdes Flores as Garcia's first running mate. According to Javier Barreda, this alliance did not benefit these three parties at all. On 13 May 2016, a political alliance between APRA and Keiko Fujimori is seen.

In the elections of said year, Alan García lost resoundingly, remaining in fifth place with 6.19%. Hours later, the candidate resigned from the APRA presidency calling for an "internal restructuring of the party." On Monday, 3 October 2016, Enrique Cornejo asks that they not think of putting obstacles that hinder votes, where he said do not think of cheating on the part of your "companions".

On 17 April 2019, former President Alan García died at the Casimiro Ulloa Hospital in Miraflores after shooting himself in the head after a preliminary search and arrest warrant against him due to the Odebrecht corruption scandal.

In the extraordinary congressional elections of 2020, held after the dissolution of Congress in 2019, the APRA had its worst electoral result of 2.7%, failing to pass the 5% electoral threshold, which means that it would not have parliamentary representation after 25 uninterrupted years. However, it managed to maintain the registration of the Political Party as it was an extraordinary electoral process.

In 2020, the party chose former Minister Nidia Vílchez as its presidential candidate for the 2021 general elections. However, and because the Special Electoral Jury (JEE) declared the party's congressional list inadmissible, they decided to withdraw Vílchez's candidacy for the presidency. Because the party did not participate in the general elections, the party could lose its registration as a political party.

APRA is a member of the Socialist International.

The youth organization of APRA is known as Juventud Aprista Peruana.

Hilda Gadea – the first female Secretary of the Economy of the Executive National Committee for APRA; later married Che Guevara and wrote a memoir.

Current structure and composition

National Executive Committee
The National Executive Committee of the Peruvian Aprista Party is the implementing body of organic action and mobilization of the party. It is the responsibility of the National Executive Committee to give the unit of total action committees and party cadres, efficiently support the development of decentralized activities and delegate decision-making authority to the Base Committees throughout the Republic, with knowledge of the national political leadership.

The establishment, functions, powers of each National Institute and Regional Institute delegates and general coordinators, are set out in the General Rules of Organization on the basis of which produces the respective functions manual, which must be approved by the National Political Commission. It is led by two general secretaries, which are elected by a National Convention.

The current National Executive Committee is led by Belén García, former congressional nominee from Ica, and Benigno Chirinos, former Senator and current Chairman of the Workers Confederation, a trade union affiliated to the party. As Institutional and Political General Secretaries, respectively, they were elected at the XXV National Convention, held from 25 to 27 October 2019.

Current leadership
 Institutional General Secretary: Belén Ysabel García Mendoza
 Political General Secretary: Benigno Hildebrando Chirinos Sotelo
 Secretary of Organization and Mobilization: Enrique Melgar Moscoso
 Secretary of Discipline: Maximiliano Paz Soldán Espinoza
 Secretary of Professional Caucuses: Ricardo Enrique Yturbe López
 Secretary of Unions and Workers: Eleodoro Calderón Zegarra
 Secretary of Popular Organizations: Filomena Arévalo Gonzales
 Secretary of Civilian Organizations: Zoila Rosario Bocángel Bravo
 Secretary of Social Management: Marilú Honorata Ticona Huamán
 Secretary of Production and Micro/Small Business: Hernán Isaac Echevarría Ardiles
 Secretary of Inter-institutional Coordination: Ruth Fanny Diones Acosta
 Secretary of Training: Álvaro Juanito Quispe Pérez
 Secretary of González Prada People's University: Carmen Esperanza Sotelo Bustamente
 Secretary of Political Training: Giovanna Rocío Temple Dueñas
 Secretary of Education and Professional Training: Norma Sebastiana Cavero Fuentes
 Secretary of Regional Governments: Miguel Ángel Javier Arango
 Secretary of Local Governments: Luis Alfredo del Carpio Villanueva
 Secretary of Women: Laura María Irene Angulo Robles
 Secretary of Youth: César Rolando Aranguren García
 Secretary of Press and Broadcast: Pedro Ricardo Palma Morales
 Secretary of Propaganda: Mayta Cápac Alatrista Herrera
 Secretary of Electoral Technique: Mercedes Milagros Núñez Gutiérrez
 Secretary of International Relations: Harry Gerardo Morris Abarca
 Secretary of Sports Affairs: María Luisa Lanatta Pino
 Secretary of Culture: Rosa Lourdes Bazán Flores

Office of the President of the Party
The Office of the President of the Party was established on 15 July 1985, in honor of Alan García's triumph in being the first member of the party to be elected President of Peru. According to the party statute, it is the highest rank in the party, exercising executive functions, and presiding all permanent organ meetings. Chosen by the National Convention, the Presidency is widely perceived as honorific position created exclusively for García. Víctor Raúl Haya de la Torre holds the eternal position of "Chief", according to Aprista lore, but never took an executive role as embodied by García.

The current President of the Party is César Trelles Lara, the former Governor of Piura, elected and ratified as such pursuant to the law of Political Parties, by the XXV National Convention, held from 25 to 27 October 2019.

 President: César Trelles Lara

National Political Commission
The National Political Commission is the highest ranking organ on party policy, after the convention. It is in charge of defining and expressing the party's position on transcendental aspects of the country, conducting party thought and action, within the framework of its ideological and programmatic conception. It establishes the political line, agrees and guides the organization, party action and the development of the objectives and goals of the National Executive Committee and the Autonomous Bodies.

According to the party's statute, the commission is formed by eleven members. Five members are elected by the National Convention, while are four appointed by the president of the party, and the two general secretaries.

The current National Political Commission is chaired by Mauricio Mulder, former Congressman from Lima and former party Secretary General. Mulder was first elected at the XXIV National Convention "Armando Villanueva", held at the party headquarters in Breña, Lima, from 7 to 9 July 2017, and was subsequently reelected by the XXV National Convention "Alan García", held from 25 to 27 October 2019.

Current leadership
 Elected by the National Convention: 
 Chairman: Mauricio Mulder
 Mercedes Cabanillas
 Elías Grijalva Alvarado
 José Germán Pimentel Aliaga
 Carmen Najarro Quispe
 Appointed by the presidency: 
 Enrique Valderrama
 Moisés Tambini del Valle
 Félix Antonio Mauricio Alor
 Juan Segundo Carlos Mejía Seminario
 General Secretaries: 
 Belén Ysabel García Mendoza
 Benigno Chirinos

Election results

Presidential elections

Elections to the Congress of the Republic

Elections to the Senate

Elections to the Chamber of Deputies

Elections to the Constituent Congresses and Assemblies

References

Bibliography
 John A. Mackay, That Other America (New York: The Friendship Press, 1935), 102–116.
 Harry Kantor, The Ideology and Program of the Peruvian Aprista Movement (Berkeley: University of California Press. London: Cambridge University Press, 1953. Reprinted, New York: Octagon Books, Inc., 1966).
 W. Stanley Rycroft, “Intellectual Renaissance in Latin America,” Book Review of The Ideology and Program of the Peruvian Aprista Movement, by Harry Kantor, in International Review of Missions, vol. 43, no. 2 (April 1954), 220–223.

External links
APRA's official website (in Spanish)
APRA's official publication (in Spanish)
"El Comité Ejecutivo Nacional del P.A.P. actual de Mulder es ilegal", VanguardiaAprista.com.
"Ojo por ojo: CEN del APRA critica a Alan García por su "doble discurso"", Lamula.pe.
"Comité Ejecutivo del APRA se enfrenta a Alan García y le responde", Peru.com.
"Partido Aprista Peruano Comité̩ Ejecutivo Nacional Secretaria General", CheleloYBorolas.com
"APRA", Trome.Pe

1924 establishments in Peru
Formerly banned socialist parties
Full member parties of the Socialist International
Political parties established in 1924
Political parties in Peru
Social democratic parties in South America
Socialist parties in Peru